John Campbell Cartwright (9 March 1888 – 1973) was a British philatelist who was added to the Roll of Distinguished Philatelists in 1956.

References

Signatories to the Roll of Distinguished Philatelists
1888 births
1973 deaths
British philatelists